Houstonia serpyllifolia, commonly called thymeleaf bluet, creeping bluet, mountain bluet, Appalachian bluet or Michaux's bluets is a species of plant in the coffee family (Rubiaceae). It is native to the eastern United States, where it is found in the central and southern Appalachian Mountains. It has been documented in the states of Pennsylvania, Maryland, West Virginia, western Virginia, North Carolina, South Carolina, Kentucky, Tennessee, Ohio, and northeastern Georgia.

Houstonia serpyllifolia is a low creeping perennial. It produces solitary, terminal blue flowers in spring and early summer. It typically grows in moist areas, and is found habitats such as streambanks, mesic woods, grassy balds, seepy rock outcrops, and spray cliffs.

The specific epithet "serpyllifolia" alludes to the resemblance between this plant and the culinary herb wild thyme, Thymus serpyllum.

References

External links
Southeastern Flora
William Britten Photography, celebrating life in the Smoky Mountains
Discover Life

serpyllifolia
Flora of the Northeastern United States
Flora of the Southeastern United States
Plants described in 1803
Taxa named by André Michaux
Flora without expected TNC conservation status